Saint-Ignace-de-Loyola is a municipality in the Lanaudière region of Quebec, Canada, part of the D'Autray Regional County Municipality. Its territory is located on 33 of the Sorel Islands in the Saint Lawrence River where it flows into Lac Saint-Pierre, the largest of which are île Madame, île aux Ours, and La Grande Île.

History
In 1895, the Parish of Saint-Ignace-de-Loyola was formed, and named in honour of the founder of the Jesuits, Ignatius López de Loyola (1491-1556). In 1896, its post office opened and a year later, the parish municipality was established by separating from La Visitation-de-l'Île-Dupas.

On October 31, 2012, it changed status from a parish municipality to municipality.

Demographics
Population trend:
 Population in 2011: 2086 (2006 to 2011 population change: 8.4%)
 Population in 2006: 1925
 Population in 2001: 1880
 Population in 1996: 1883
 Population in 1991: 1827

Private dwellings occupied by usual residents: 885 (total dwellings: 945)

Mother tongue:
 English as first language: 0%
 French as first language: 97.7%
 English and French as first language: 0%
 Other as first language: 2.3%

Education

Commission scolaire des Samares operates francophone public schools, including:
 École de l'Île Saint-Ignace - It temporarily closed in 2016

The Sir Wilfrid Laurier School Board operates anglophone public schools, including:
 Joliette Elementary School in Saint-Charles-Borromée
 Joliette High School in Joliette

See also
List of municipalities in Quebec

References

External links
Saint-Ignace-de-Loyola - MRC d'Autray

Incorporated places in Lanaudière
Municipalities in Quebec